Messengers of Peace may refer to:

 United Nations Messengers of Peace, a special post-nominal honorific title of authority bestowed by the United Nations
 Messengers of Peace (Scouting), an initiative by the World Organization of the Scout Movement
Messenger of Peace, a 1947 American film directed by Frank Strayer
Messenger of Peace Chapel Car, built in 1898, currently housed at the Northwest Railway Museum in Snoqualmie, Washington
Messenger of Peace (missionary ship), built in 1827 in Avarua, Rarotonga